Two ships of the Royal Navy have borne the name HMS Nabob, for a Nabob, which is an Anglo-Indian term for a conspicuously wealthy man who made his fortune in the Orient, especially in the Indian subcontinent.

 HMS Nabob was the East Indiaman , launched in 1766, which the Navy bought in 1777 for use as a storeship, converted to a hospital ship in 1780, and then sold in 1783.
  was the ex-USS Edisto, an escort carrier launched in 1943 and provided to the United Kingdom on Lend-Lease. She was torpedoed in 1944, not repaired, and sold to the Netherlands for breaking up in 1947, resold in 1951, and finally broken up in Taiwan in 1977.

References
Citations

Bibliography
 
 

Royal Navy ship names